The Last Days of the Celtic Tiger is a 2007 play by Irish writer Paul Howard, as part of the Ross O'Carroll-Kelly series. It had its world premiere on 8 November 2007 at the Olympia Theatre, Dublin produced by Landmark Productions.

The title is a reference to the Celtic Tiger, a period of prosperity in the Republic of Ireland from c.1992–2006.

Plot
The Celtic Tiger finishes but the same bad news arises as This Champagne Mojito Is The Last Thing I Own.

References

2007 plays
Comedy plays
Irish plays
Plays set in Ireland
Ross O'Carroll-Kelly